Martin Stellman (London, July 28, 1948) is a British screenwriter and director best known for creating and writing The Interpreter, starring Nicole Kidman and Sean Penn, and co-writing with Franc Roddam the 1979 British cult classic Quadrophenia.

He wrote and directed the action thriller For Queen and Country starring Denzel Washington playing a Falklands War veteran. He attended Bristol University, before joining the psychedelic band Principal Edwards Magic Theatre and is a graduate of the National Film and Television School. He often collaborates with British screenwriter and director Brian Ward.

He recently teamed up with Idris Elba co-writing Yardie, Elba's feature debut. Elba took inspiration from Stellman's earlier film Babylon, a drama about sound-system culture in London during the 1970s.

Filmography

Writer 
 Yardie (2018)
 The Interpreter (2005)
 Shoebox Zoo (TV series, 3 episodes) (2004)
 Tabloid (2001)
 For Queen and Country (1988)
 Defence of the Realm (1986)
 Babylon (1980)
 Quadrophenia (1979)

Director 
 Harry (TV series, 3 episodes) (1993)
 For Queen and Country (1988)

References

External links 
 

1948 births
Living people
British male screenwriters
British television writers
Alumni of the National Film and Television School
British male television writers